The Great Barrier Reef Arena (also known as the Ray Mitchell Oval and Harrup Park) is an Australian rules football and cricket ground in the city of Mackay, Queensland, Australia.

Australian rules football 
On 19 September 2018, the Gold Coast Suns announced a four-year deal with the Mackay Council to play AFL Women's matches at Harrup Park between 2019-2022.

Domestic cricket matches 

The first recorded match on the ground occurred when Queensland Country XI played against the touring West Indians in 1968, with Rohan Kanhai scoring 206 runs on the 2nd day.  In 1978, the ground staged a single World Series Cricket "Country Cavaliers" match.

The ground held its first two List A one day matches in 1988, when Queensland played the touring Pakistanis on 3 and 4 December 1988.

The first first-class match to be played there came in 1995 when Queensland played against the touring Sri Lankans, with the match ending in a 273 run victory for Queensland, with Michael Kasprowicz taking match figures of 12/95.  The second first-class game, and first Sheffield Shield game came in 2015 when New South Wales defeated Queensland in a close contest by 3 wickets. Queensland opener Matt Renshaw top scored with 170, and New South Wales spinner Will Somerville collected 7 wickets.   A List A match was played there in October 2011 between Queensland and Tasmania in the 2011/12 Ryobi One Day Cup. The ground was then host to a 2016 Quadrangular series between Australia A, India A, South Africa A and Australia's National Performance Squad, being won by India A. 

Brisbane Heat from the Women's Big Bash Cricket League played six home games at Mackay in 2018 and 2019.

Great Barrier Reef Arena hosted nine WBBL games from 13 November 2021 to 20 November 2021, with six teams competing in two consecutive "festival rounds".

International cricket matches 

The ground hosted a One Day International match during the 1992 Cricket World Cup, with India and Sri Lanka playing on 28 February.  The match was abandoned after two deliveries due to torrential rain, despite the best efforts of the groundstaff to dry the outfield. Thus, Sri Lankan fast bowler Champaka Ramanayake and Indian batsman Krishnamachari Srikkanth hold unusual distinctions: Ramanayake is the only male international bowler to have ever bowled at the venue, and Srikkanth is the batsman who scored the only run ever in the only men's international cricket match played here.  This match was also the debut match of Ajay Jadeja.

In 2021, the venue was selected to host three Women's One Day International matches between Australia and India, the first of which was played on 21 September 2021.

References

External links
Ray Mitchell Oval at ESPNcricinfo
Ray Mitchell Oval at CricketArchive

Cricket grounds in Australia
1992 Cricket World Cup stadiums
Sports venues in Queensland
World Series Cricket venues
North East Australian Football League grounds